Socket 939 is a CPU socket released by AMD in June 2004 to supersede the previous Socket 754 for Athlon 64 processors. Socket 939 was succeeded by Socket AM2 in May 2006. It is the second socket designed for AMD's AMD64 range of processors.

Availability
Socket 939 processors and motherboards became available in June 2004, and were superseded by Socket AM2 in May 2006. AMD has ceased the production of this socket to focus on current and future platforms. However, at least one new Socket 939 motherboard has been produced utilizing a modern AMD chipset since AMD transitioned to Socket AM2.  In 2009 motherboard maker ASRock released a new Socket 939 motherboard.  The motherboard utilizes the AMD 785G IGP chipset and a SB710 southbridge.

Both single and dual-core processors were manufactured for this socket under the Athlon 64, Athlon 64 FX, Athlon 64 X2, Sempron and Opteron names. The Opteron 190, featuring a 2.8 GHz clock speed and 1 MB of Level 2 cache per core, was the fastest dual-core processor manufactured for this socket, however the availability of this processor was limited. The Opteron 185 (locked multiplier) and Athlon 64 FX-60 (unlocked multiplier), with a slightly slower clock speed of 2.6 GHz, were the fastest widely available dual-core processors for the socket. The Opteron 156 ran slightly faster at 3 GHz, making it the fastest single core processor supporting the socket 939 interface.

Technical specifications
Socket 939 supports dual channel DDR SDRAM memory, with 6.4 GB/s memory bandwidth.  Processors for this socket support 3DNow!, SSE2, and SSE3 (revision E or later) instruction sets. It features one 16 bit HyperTransport link running up to 1000 MT/s. 

In regards to video expansion slots, Socket 939 systems can be found with both AGP slots and PCI-E slots. 

Processors using this socket have 64KB each Level 1 instruction and data caches, and either 256KB, 512KB or 1 MB Level 2 cache.

See also
 List of AMD microprocessors

References

External links

AMD sockets